The 2019 Trofeu Internacional Ciutat de Barcelona was a professional tennis tournament played on outdoor clay courts. It was the fifth edition of the tournament which was part of the 2019 ITF Women's World Tennis Tour. It took place in Barcelona, Spain between 10 and 16 June 2019.

Singles main-draw entrants

Seeds

 1 Rankings are as of 27 May 2019.

Other entrants
The following players received wildcards into the singles main draw:
  Cristina Bucșa
  Eva Guerrero Álvarez
  Guiomar Maristany
  Carlota Martínez Círez

The following players received entry from the qualifying draw:
  Manon Arcangioli
  Alison Bai
  Marina Bassols Ribera
  Irene Burillo Escorihuela
  Jaimee Fourlis
  Andrea Gámiz
  Despina Papamichail
  Margot Yerolymos

The following players received entry as a lucky loser:
  Vivien Juhászová

Champions

Singles

 Allie Kiick def.  Çağla Büyükakçay, 7–6(7–3), 3–6, 6–1

Doubles

 Kyōka Okamura /  Moyuka Uchijima def.  Marina Bassols Ribera /  Yvonne Cavallé Reimers, 7–6(9–7), 6–4

References

External links
 2019 Trofeu Internacional Ciutat de Barcelona at ITFtennis.com
 Official website

2019 ITF Women's World Tennis Tour
2019 in Spanish sport